Mattia Muroni (born 6 April 1996) is an Italian professional footballer who plays as a midfielder for  club Reggiana.

Career
Born in Oristano, Muroni started his career in Cagliari youth sector. In July 2015, he was loaned to Serie C club Tuttocuoio. Muroni made his professional debut on 6 September against Rimini.

For the 2016–17 season, he left Cagliari and signed with Olbia. On 4 May 2019, he played his 100 match for the club against Pro Vercelli. Muroni played four seasons for Olbia.

On 11 January 2020, he moved to Modena.

On 15 July 2021, he signed with Reggiana.

References

External links
 
 

1996 births
Living people
People from Oristano
Footballers from Sardinia
Italian footballers
Association football midfielders
Serie C players
Cagliari Calcio players
A.C. Tuttocuoio 1957 San Miniato players
Olbia Calcio 1905 players
Modena F.C. 2018 players
A.C. Reggiana 1919 players